Celia Villalobos Talero (born 18 April 1949) is a Spanish People's Party (PP) politician.

Born in Benalmádena, Province of Málaga, she was the mayor of Málaga from 1995 to 2000. She left office when she joined José María Aznar's cabinet as the minister of food and health from 2000 to 2002. Her role at this ministry was controversial, mainly due to a speech she gave during the concern over mad cow disease. However, during her period in office, the government delegated all public health responsibilities to the autonomous communities. She was deputy speaker of the Congress of Deputies between 2011 and 2016.

She is one of the most liberal members of her party. She voted in favour of same-sex marriage in 2005, for which she was economically penalised by the PP, and she left the Spanish Congress during a vote on legal abortion extension cases, which the PP opposed.

References

1949 births
21st-century Spanish women politicians
Living people
Government ministers of Spain
Knights Grand Cross of the Order of Isabella the Catholic
Mayors of places in Andalusia
Members of the 3rd Congress of Deputies (Spain)
Members of the 4th Congress of Deputies (Spain)
Members of the 5th Congress of Deputies (Spain)
Members of the 6th Congress of Deputies (Spain)
Members of the 7th Congress of Deputies (Spain)
Members of the 8th Congress of Deputies (Spain)
Members of the 9th Congress of Deputies (Spain)
Members of the 10th Congress of Deputies (Spain)
Members of the 11th Congress of Deputies (Spain)
Members of the 12th Congress of Deputies (Spain)
Municipal councillors in the province of Málaga
People from Málaga
People's Party (Spain) politicians
Recipients of the Order of Isabella the Catholic
Women government ministers of Spain
Women mayors of places in Spain
Women members of the Congress of Deputies (Spain)
20th-century Spanish women politicians